Squadrons are the main form of flying unit of the Royal Air Force (RAF).  These include Royal Flying Corps (RFC) and Royal Naval Air Service (RNAS) squadrons incorporated into the RAF when it was formed on 1 April 1918, during the First World War. Other squadrons of the RAF include those from Commonwealth air forces which have served within the RAF structure and squadrons of the Fleet Air Arm before it transferred to the Royal Navy in 1939.

Some squadrons have an individual tradition of presenting their squadron number in Roman numerals or using a suffix to their squadron number (such as "(F)" for "Fighter", "(B)" for "Bomber" or "(AC)" for "Army Co-operation") to indicate a past or present role. An example would be No. 18 (Bomber) Squadron RAF which currently actually operates the heavy-lift Chinook helicopter. However, these practices have, at least in the past, been deprecated at higher levels and generally only apply to certain squadrons with long traditions, especially those numbered from 1-20. Historical Squadrons can choose to 'lay up' their standards at RAF Cranwell or in places of worship following disbandment.

Flying training units and operational evaluation squadrons have generally been (Reserve) squadrons, although they are regular active-duty units. The policy of the (Reserve) numberplate was rescinded in February 2018, to coincide with the renaming of 22 (Training) Group to just 22 Group in line with other RAF Groups.

Some Squadron names include the location they were originally formed.

Regular RFC, RNAS, and RAF squadrons (Nos. 1–299)
Squadrons in Bold Type are currently active

Nos. 1–50

Nos. 51–66

Nos. 67–71
During the First World War, in order to avoid confusion with similarly-numbered British flying squadrons, units of the separate Australian Flying Corps were known for administrative purposes as 67, 68, 69, and 71 squadrons. Since the Second World War these numbers have always been used by RAF units.

However, the designation 70 (or LXX) Squadron has always been used for RFC/RAF units.

 No. 67 Squadron
 1916–18: No. 1 Squadron, Australian Flying Corps 
 From 1941: No. 67 Squadron
 No. 68 Squadron
 1916–18: No. 2 Squadron, Australian Flying Corps
 From 1941: No. 68 Squadron
 No. 69 Squadron RAF
 1916–18: No. 3 Squadron Australian Flying Corps
 From 1941: No. 69 Squadron
 No. LXX Squadron (Atlas C1)
 No. 71 Squadron
 1916–18: No. 4 Squadron Australian Flying Corps
 From 1940: No. 71 Squadron (staffed by US volunteers in 1940–42)

Nos. 72–100

Nos. 101–150

Nos. 151–200

Nos. 201–250
The first squadrons to carry numbers above 200 were former RNAS squadrons that were renumbered upon amalgamation with 200 added to their RNAS squadron number. Independent flights of the RNAS were grouped together in squadrons and given numbers in the 200 series.

Nos. 251–299

Nos. 300–352
Squadrons in the 300–352 series were staffed during the Second World War by volunteers from countries in occupied Europe. In some cases, these RAF squadrons and personnel were regarded by a relevant government-in-exile as serving concurrently with its air force.

Similarly, in 1940–42, three "Eagle Squadrons" were composed of volunteers from the USA: No. 71 (Eagle) Squadron, later 334th Fighter Squadron USAAF; No. 121 (Eagle) Squadron, later 335th Fighter Squadron USAAF and No. 133 (Eagle) Squadron, later 336th Fighter Squadron USAAF.

Polish (300–309)
See also Squadrons Nos. 315–318, 663 and Polish Fighting Team (under Other)
 No. 300 "Land of Masovia" Polish Bomber Squadron (Ziemi Mazowieckiej)
 No. 301 "Land of Pomerania" Polish Bomber Squadron (Ziemi Pomorskiej)
 No. 302 "City of Poznań" Polish Fighter Squadron (Poznański)
 No. 303 "Kosciuszko" Polish Fighter Squadron (Warszawski im. Tadeusza Kościuszki)
 No. 304 "Land of Silesia" Polish Bomber Squadron (Ziemi Śląskiej im. Ks. Józefa Poniatowskiego)
 No. 305 "Land of Greater Poland" Polish Bomber Squadron (Ziemi Wielkopolskiej im. Marszałka Józefa Piłsudskiego)
 No. 306 "City of Toruń" Polish Fighter Squadron (Toruński)
 No. 307 "City of Lwów" Polish Fighter Squadron (Lwowskich Puchaczy)
 No. 308 "City of Kraków" Polish Fighter Squadron (Krakowski)
 No. 309 "Land of Czerwień" Polish Fighter-Reconnaissance Squadron (Ziemi Czerwieńskiej)

Czechoslovakian (310–313)

(Note: the RAF has never had a flying unit named 314 Squadron, although it has used the number for No. 314 Technical Services Unit.  A proposed 314 Squadron was allocated squadron code "UY" during the period April to September 1939, but was never formed.)

Polish (315–318)
See also Squadrons Nos. 300–309, 663 and Polish Fighting Team (under Other)

Note: the RAF never had a No. 319 Squadron; the "Polish Fighting Team" was attached to No. 145 Fighter Squadron. A proposed 319 Squadron was allocated squadron codes VE for the period April to September 1939. There was also 663 Artillery Observation Squadron; No. 138 Special Duty Squadron Polish Flight "C" and No. 1586 Polish Special Duty Flight.

Dutch (320–325)

Note: Nos. 323 to 325 Squadrons were not formed, but allocated Squadron Codes GN, PQ and EA respectively for the period April to September 1939. However these numbers were used for post-war Royal Netherlands Air Force squadrons.

French (326–329)
See also Nos. 340–347 Squadron

Norwegian (330–334)

Greek (335–339)

Note: Nos: 337–339 never formed, but were allocated Squadron Codes OK, ML and KN respectively for the period April to September 1939. The Royal Hellenic Air Force 13th Light Bomber Squadron was also under RAF command in World War II.

French (340–347)
See also Nos. 326–329 Squadron

Note: No. 348 Squadron was not formed, but Squadron codes letters FR were allocated for the period April to September 1939.

Belgian (349–350)

Yugoslavian (351–352)

Nos. 353–361

Note: Nos. 362–399 Squadrons were not formed.

Article XV squadrons of World War II (Nos. 400–490) 
Under Article XV of the British Commonwealth Air Training Plan, the air forces of Australia, Canada and New Zealand formed squadrons for service under RAF operational control. Most were new formations, however some had already existed prior to the creation of Article XV and had already been operational during the war, including combat operations.

Royal Canadian Air Force (400–443)

Note: Although squadron numbers 444 to 449 were also reserved for the RCAF, it did not use them during the Second World War.

Royal Australian Air Force (450–467)

Note: Although squadron numbers 465 and 468 to 479 were also reserved for the RAAF during the Second World War, it did not use them.

Royal New Zealand Air Force (485–490)

Note: Although the squadron numbers 491 to 499 were reserved for RNZAF units during the Second World War, no such squadrons were formed.

Royal Auxiliary Air Force squadrons (Nos. 500–509)
Formed as "Special Reserve" squadrons but absorbed into the Royal Auxiliary Air Force

Note: No. 505, 506, 507, 508 and 509 Squadrons allocated Squadron codes YF, FS, GX, DY and BQ respectively for the period April to September 1939, but were never formed.

Regular RAF squadrons (Nos. 510–598)

Note: No No. 599 Squadron seems to have been formed. There were to have been Reserve squadrons using numbers 551–566 which would have been created by adding 500 to existing Operational Training Unit designations. In the event the plan was never put into effect, although there was some desultory use of some of the numbers by some of the OTUs for a short period. Despite their lack of formal activation, this block of numbers has never been re-allocated for use by other units.

Advanced Training Squadrons (550–565)
In the event of a German Invasion the Operational Training Units would have been re-formed into the Squadrons below, under plans as part of Operation Saracen, formulated in Spring 1940, which were later revised as Operation Banquet. Some reserve Squadron numbers were used by their respective OTU's during operational tasks until at least May 1944.

No. 550 Squadron – Air Fighting Development Unit (Banquet)
No. 551 Squadron – 51 Operational Training Unit (Saracen and Banquet)
No. 552 Squadron – 51 Operational Training Unit (Saracen and Banquet)
No. 553 Squadron – 53 Operational Training Unit (Saracen and Banquet)
No. 554 Squadron – 53 Operational Training Unit (Saracen and Banquet)
No. 555 Squadron – 55 Operational Training Unit (Saracen and Banquet)
No. 556 Squadron – 56 Operational Training Unit (Saracen and Banquet)
No. 557 Squadron – 57 Operational Training Unit (Saracen and Banquet)
No. 558 Squadron – 58 Operational Training Unit (Saracen and Banquet)
No. 559 Squadron – 59 Operational Training Unit (Saracen and Banquet)
No. 560 Squadron – 56 Operational Training Unit (Banquet)
No. 561 Squadron – 61 Operational Training Unit (Saracen and Banquet)
No. 562 Squadron – 57 Operational Training Unit (Banquet)
No. 563 Squadron – 58 Operational Training Unit (Banquet)
No. 564 Squadron – 59 Operational Training Unit (Banquet)
No. 565 Squadron – 61 Operational Training Unit (Banquet)

Royal Auxiliary Air Force Squadrons (600–616)

Note: No. 606 Squadron RAF was allocated Squadron codes BG for the period April to September 1939, but was not formed. A non-flying No. 606 Helicopter Support Squadron of the RAuxAF was later formed in 1999.

Regular RAF squadrons (Nos. 617–650)

Note: Nos. 629, 632–634, 636–638, 641–643 and 645–649 were never formed, but some were allocated Squadron codes for the period April to September 1939 – 629 (LQ), 632 (LO), 636 (VZ), 637 (UK), 638 (PZ), 641 (EV), 645 (KF), 646 (YG), 647 (ZS), 648 (YT) and 649 (HA). However a fictitious "633 Squadron" was featured in the eponymous novel and film. In addition, a fictitious 641 Squadron featured in the film "Mosquito Squadron". Also, RAF Volunteer Gliding Squadrons (formerly Volunteer Gliding Schools until 2005) have been numbered in the range 611 to 671 since 1955.

Air Observation Post squadrons
These squadrons were formed during the Second World War to perform artillery spotting and liaison roles, in co-operation with Army units.  Most AOP squadron aircrew were provided by the Army. Nos. 661–664 and 666 Squadron were re-formed as Royal Auxiliary Air Force units in 1949. Nos. 651, 652 and 656 Squadron were transferred to the Army Air Corps in 1957.

Regular RAF squadrons (Nos. 667–695)

Note: Nos. 693–694 and 696–699 Squadrons were never formed.

Fleet Air Arm squadrons

While still under the control of the Royal Air Force, flights of the Fleet Air Arm (FAA) were organised into squadrons with numbers in the 700 and 800 range.  The range 700 to 750 had been previously used for Fleet Air Arm Catapult Flight numbers.

These squadrons were transferred to the Royal Navy (RN) in 1939, becoming Royal Naval Air Squadrons (RNAS).  The 700 and 800 range of squadron numbers continued to be used by the Royal Navy for newly formed Royal Naval Air Squadrons.

Training Depot Stations
Training Depot Stations (TDS) were still in use after the formation of the Royal Air Force in 1918.

University Air Squadrons

The majority of Universities in the United Kingdom are, or have been, represented by Royal Air Force (RAF) University Air Squadrons (UAS), where under-graduates can sample elements of the Royal Air Force, and learn to fly, as well as take advantage of scholarship schemes.  Previously operating the Bulldog T.1, they now all currently operate the Tutor T.1.  Although each UAS retain their own identity an activities, when two are co-located at the same airfield, such as Cambridge UAS and London UAS at RAF Wittering, and Liverpool UAS and Manchester and Salford UAS at RAF Woodvale, the two individual UAS share the same fleet of aircraft.  All University Air Squadrons are currently commanded by No. 6 Flying Training School RAF (6FTS).

Squadrons below listed in bold are currently active, others are disbanded, or otherwise amalgamated into a current existing UAS.

Air Experience Flights 

Air Experience Flights are co-located with University Air Squadrons and operate the Tutor T1 training aircraft.

Volunteer Gliding Squadrons

Initially formed as Volunteer Gliding Schools, these squadrons retained their gliding school numbers when reformed as squadrons. Conflicts with the main Squadron numbers resolved by the VGS suffix. These Squadrons operate the Viking T1 glider.

HQ No. 2 Flying Training School RAF - (RAF Syerston)
Central Gliding School - (RAF Syerston)

Independent Flights
The Royal Air Force (RAF) maintains a number of independent flights; some on a permanent basis, others on an ad-hoc basis as required.  Historically, some flights were alphabetically named.  For a full list, see the list of Royal Air Force aircraft independent flights.
Bold listings are currently active RAF flights.
Battle of Britain Memorial Flight (BBMF) – at RAF Coningsby – 6x Spitfire (various marks), 2x Hurricane, 1x Lancaster, 1x Dakota, 2x Chipmunk T10
1310 Flight – at Gao International Airport – 2x Chinook HC5, HC6, HC6A
1312 Flight – at RAF Mount Pleasant – 1x Voyager KC2, 1x Atlas C1
1435 Flight – at RAF Mount Pleasant – 4x Typhoon FGR4

Dormant Squadrons
RAF College Cranwell stores some Standards for disbanded Squadrons that have the potential to be re-activated in the future, preserving the heritage of historic units. Once a Squadron Standard is 'laid up' in a place of worship, upon the disbandment of the Squadron, that Standard can no longer be reactivated. Many UK churches have Standards from the RAF following a service of Disbandment. However, some Squadrons choose to lay up their Standards in College Hall at RAF Cranwell, the spiritual home of the RAF, and may be reactivated as active Squadrons in the future. Old disbanded squadrons that have laid up their Standards can be presented new Standards to reactivate them, but this is currently extremely rare.

Squadron Standards (and their last operated aircraft) that are on display in the College Hall Rotunda in order of seniority are:

No. 31 Squadron Tornado GR4 (to be reformed as a General Atomics Protector RG1 squadron)
No. V (Army Cooperation) Squadron Sentinel R1
No. 111 Squadron – Tornado F3
No. XV Squadron – Tornado GR4
No. 42 Squadron – Nimrod MR2
No. 50 Squadron – Vulcan B.2/K.2
No. 74 Squadron – Hawk T1
No. 44 Squadron – Vulcan B.2
No. 3 Squadron RAF Regiment
No. 58 Squadron RAF Regiment

Other Squadrons
The Royal Air force and Royal flying corps has always comprised a certain number of non-numbered Squadrons to fulfil special duties, experimental or one-off tasks.

Communication Squadrons

To allow rapid transport of Air Officers, staff and other important people many units and Headquarters operated communication Sections, Flights, Squadrons or wings.

Barrage Balloon Squadrons of the Auxiliary Air Force

Squadron codes

Most units of the Royal Air Force are identified by alphabetical (or similar) characters, known as a "squadron code", that is painted on all aircraft belonging to that unit. When individual units are assigned unusually large numbers of aircraft, multiple squadron codes have been used.

Other air forces, especially those from other Commonwealth countries, have often used similar systems of identification. During the Second World War, when units from other air forces were attached to the RAF – such as the Article XV squadrons (also known as "400 series squadrons") – their squadron codes were often changed, to avoid confusion with RAF units.

Historically, the codes have usually been two letters of the alphabet, painted on the rear fuselage next to the RAF roundel. These formed a suffix or prefix to the call sign of each aircraft (on the other side of the roundel) which was usually a single letter (e. g. "G for George"). In general, when an aircraft is lost or withdrawn from use, its call sign has been applied to its replacement or another aircraft.

See also

Royal Air Force

List of Royal Air Force aircraft squadrons
List of Royal Air Force aircraft independent flights
List of conversion units of the Royal Air Force
List of Royal Air Force Glider units
List of Royal Air Force Operational Training Units
List of Royal Air Force schools
List of Royal Air Force units & establishments
List of RAF squadron codes
List of RAF Regiment units
List of Battle of Britain squadrons
List of wings of the Royal Air Force
Royal Air Force roundels

Army Air Corps

List of Army Air Corps aircraft units

Fleet Air Arm

List of Fleet Air Arm aircraft squadrons
List of Fleet Air Arm groups
List of aircraft units of the Royal Navy
List of aircraft wings of the Royal Navy

Others

List of Air Training Corps squadrons
University Air Squadron
Air Experience Flight
Volunteer Gliding Squadron
United Kingdom military aircraft serial numbers
United Kingdom aircraft test serials
British military aircraft designation systems

Notes

References
 Halley, James J. The Squadrons of the Royal Air Force & Commonwealth 1918–1988. Tonbridge, Kent, UK: Air Britain (Historians) Ltd., 1988. .
 Jefford, C.G. RAF Squadrons, a Comprehensive record of the Movement and Equipment of all RAF Squadrons and their Antecedents since 1912. Shropshire, UK: Airlife Publishing, 1988 (second edition 2001). .
Lake, Alan. "Flying Units of the RAF".Airlife Publishing. Shrewsbury. 1999.

External links
a list of current squadrons from the RAF website

Royal Air Force aircraft squadrons

Squadrons
Royal Air Force aircraft squadrons